Cowell may refer to:

People
Cowell (surname), surname origin, and people named Cowell

Places
 Cowell College, California, United States
 Henry Cowell Redwoods State Park, United States
 Cowell, South Australia, Australia
 Cowell, Concord, California, United States

Ships
 USS Cowell